Fox House, Fox Hall, Fox Building, Fox Farm, or Fox Farm site may refer to:

Entertainment
 Fox Farm (novel), a 1911 novel by the British writer Warwick Deeping
 Fox Farm (film), a 1922 silent film directed by Guy Newall based on novel

Places
(sorted by state, then city/town)
Fox Motel House, listed on the National Register of Historic Places (NRHP) in White County, Arkansas
Fox House (Pine Bluff, Arkansas), listed on the NRHP in Jefferson County, Arkansas
Fox Stone Barn, Boulder, Colorado, listed on the NRHP in Boulder County, Colorado
White–Fox House Archeological Site, New Smyrna Beach, Florida, listed on the NRHP in Volusia County, Florida
J. C. Fox Building, Hailey, Idaho, listed on the NRHP in Blaine County, Idaho
Fox–Worswick House, Hailey, Idaho, listed on the NRHP in Blaine County, Idaho
Fox River House, Aurora, Illinois, listed on the NRHP in Kane County, Illinois
William Fox House, listed on the NRHP in Pulaski County, Kentucky
Fox Farm site (Mays Lick, Kentucky) near Mays Lick, Kentucky, NRHP-listed
Weaver–Fox House, Uniontown, Maryland, NRHP-listed
Warren Fox Building, Lowell, Massachusetts, NRHP-listed
Herbert M. Fox House, Becker, Minnesota, NRHP-listed
Foxx–Cox House, listed on the NRHP in Lincoln County, Mississippi
Fox House (Wanilla, Mississippi), listed on the NRHP in Lawrence County, Mississippi
Van Winkle–Fox House, listed on the NRHP in Bergen County, New Jersey
James Fox House, listed on the NRHP in Yates County, New York
Albert R. Fox House, listed on the NRHP in Rensselaer County, New York
Fox Haven Plantation, listed on the NRHP in Rutherford County, North Carolina
Snipes–Fox House, listed on the NRHP in Chatham County, North Carolina
Fox–Pope Farm, listed on the NRHP in Geauga County, Ohio
Fox House (Lexington, South Carolina), listed on the NRHP in Lexington County, South Carolina
S. H. Fox House, listed on the NRHP in Collin County, Texas
Jacob Fox House, listed on the NRHP in Victoria County, Texas
Fox–Cook Farm, listed on the NRHP in Rutland County, Vermont
Fox Hall (Westmore, Vermont), listed on the NRHP in Orleans County, Vermont
John Fox Jr. House, listed on the NRHP in Wise County, Virginia
Fox Farm site (McMullin, Virginia), listed on the NRHP in Smyth County, Virginia
Red Fox Farm, listed on the NRHP in Mecklenburg County, Virginia
Fox House, South Yorkshire
Fox Hall, West Virginia
Fox Hall (Fitchburg, Wisconsin), listed on the NRHP in Dane County, Wisconsin